The Primetime Emmy Award for Outstanding Sound Mixing for a Limited or Anthology Series or Movie is an award handed out annually at the Creative Arts Emmy Award. Limited series and television movies shot on videotape competed alongside variety series and specials for Outstanding Tape Sound Mixing before 1986. They also faced off against regular series for Outstanding Achievement in Film Sound Mixing before 1983.

In the following list, the first titles listed in gold are the winners; those not in gold are nominees, which are listed in alphabetical order. The years given are those in which the ceremonies took place:



Winners and nominations

1970s
Outstanding Achievement in Film Sound Mixing

Outstanding Achievement in Film or Tape Sound Mixing

Outstanding Achievement in Film Sound Mixing

1980s

Outstanding Sound Mixing for a Limited Series or Movie

1990s

2000s

2010s

2020s

Sound mixers with multiple awards

4 awards
 Adam Jenkins
 Eddie J. Nelson
 George E. Porter 

3 awards
 Rick Ash
 Sam Black
 David E. Fluhr
 Robert L. Harman
 Grover B. Helsley
 Richard D. Rogers
 William McCaughey
 Bill Teague

2 awards
 Trevor Black
 David E. Campbell
 Joseph D. Citarella
 Anthony Constantini
 Gordon L. Day
 Mark Dowson
 Robert W. Glass Jr.
 Thomas J. Huth
 Donald F. Johnson
 Daniel J. Leahy 
 Mel Metcalfe
 Terry Porter
 John T. Reitz
 Theodore Soderberg 
 Mark Taylor
 George Tarrant
 Ray West
 Russell Williams II
 Howard Wilmarth

Programs with multiple nominations

5 nominations
 American Horror Story

4 nominations
 Fargo
 The Pacific Roots Sherlock3 nominations
 Band of Brothers From the Earth to the Moon Genius The Winds of War2 nominations
 American Crime Story Horatio Hornblower Into the West John Adams True Detective''

Sound mixers with multiple nominations

21 nominations
 Robert L. Harman

20 nominations
 George E. Porter

19 nominations
 Eddie J. Nelson

17 nominations
 William McCaughey

16 nominations
 Richard D. Rogers

15 nominations
 Grover B. Helsley

13 nominations
 Rick Ash

10 nominations
 Joe Earle
 Robert W. Glass Jr.
 Ray West

8 nominations 
 Rick Alexander
 Doug Andham
 Sam Black
 David E. Fluhr 
 Adam Jenkins
 Daniel J. Leahy
 Mel Metcalfe

7 nominations
 John Asman
 Kevin Patrick Burns
 Joseph D. Citarella
 Hoppy Mehterian
 Tim Philben
 Terry Porter

6 nominations
 Gordon L. Day
 Howard Bargroff
 Thomas J. Huth
 Todd Orr
 Howard Wilmarth
 Howard Wollman 

5 nominations
 Alan Bernard
 Jay Meagher
 Scott Millan
 Michael Minkler
 Bill Teague

4 nominations
 Terry O'Bright
 Chris Carpenter
 Jacob Goldstein
 David J. Hudson
 Mark Linden
 Bruce Litecky 
 Don MacDougall
 John Mooney
 Bob Pettis
 Michael Playfair
 Keith A. Wester
 John Wilkinson 

3 nominations
 John Bauman
 Don Cahn
 David E. Campbell
 Chris Carpenter
 Michael C. Casper
 Anthony Constantini
 Jim Cook
 John W. Cook II
 Tamás Csaba
 Joe DeAngelis
 Mike Dowson
 Henry Embry
 Marc Fishman
 Joe Foglia
 Judy Getz
 Peter Gleaves
 Robin Gregory
 George R. Groves Jr. 
 Paul Hamblin
 Charles T. Knight
 Geoffrey Patterson
 Tara A. Paul 
 Richard Portman
 Andrew Ramage
 John T. Reitz
 Keith Rogers
 David M. Ronne
 Richard Schexnayder
 Larry Stensvold
 Mark Taylor
 Russell Williams II
 Stan Wetzel

2 nominations
 Gary Alexander
 Wayne Artman
 Douglas Axtell
 Michael Barry
 Eric Batut
 Bob Beemer
 Trevor Black
 Onnalee Blank
 Gary Bolger
 Gary Bourgeois
 Arnold Braun 
 Neil Brody
 Bob Bronow
 David Brownlow
 Rudi Buckle
 Bayard Carey
 Colin Charles
 Clark Conrad
 Christian T. Cooke
 Gary Coppola
 Tony Dawe
 Alan Decker
 Don Digirolamo 
 Mary H. Ellis
 Joel Fein
 Robert Fernandez
 Tom Fleischman
 Martin Fossum
 Bill Freesh
 Dominick Gaffey
 Stanley P. Gordon
 Roy Granville
 Charles Grenzbach
 Maury Harris
 Rick Hart
 John Hayward
 Wayne Heitman
 Mark Hensley
 Stuart Hilliker 
 Lora Hirschberg
 Walter Hoylman
 Bobby Johanson
 Donald F. Johnson 
 Simon Kaye
 Drew Kunin

 Tony Lamberti
 David Lee
 Martin Lee
 Charles Lewis
 Scott R. Lewis
 Liam Lockheart
 Kirk Lynds
 Craig Mann
 Bill Marky
 Colin Martin
 Grant Maxwell
 Melvin M. Metcalfe
 Don Minkler
 Lee Minkler
 Edward L. Moskowitz
 Joel Moss
 Douglas Murray
 Doug Nelson
 William Nicholson
 Jacques Nosco
 Mike Olman
 Craig M. Otte
 Clive Pendry 
 Thom K. Piper 
 Ken Polk
 Richard Pryke
 Richard Raguse
 Kenneth B. Ross
 Sean Rush
 James Sabat
 Leslie Shatz
 Harry E. Snodgrass 
 Theodore Soderberg 
 Lou Solakofski
 David Stephenson
 Nelson Stoll
 Alan L. Stone
 Don Summer
 Oren Sushko
 Peter Sutton
 James M. Tanenbaum
 George Tarrant
 Curly Thirlwell 
 Doug E. Turner
 Dan Wallin
 Joe White
 Gary Wilkins
 Nick Wollage
 Brad Zoern

Notes

References

Sound Mixing for a Limited Series or Movie